The 2008 European Badminton Championships were the 21st tournament of the European Badminton Championships. They were held in Messecenter, Herning, Denmark, from April 16 to April 20, 2008, and they were organised by the Badminton Europe and the Danmarks Badminton Forbund.

The competition was preceded by the 2008 European Mixed Team Badminton Championships, held between April 12 and April 15.

Medalists

Results

Men's singles

Women's singles

Men's doubles

Women's doubles

Mixed doubles

* Carsten Mogensen was given a red card after the game for kicking his racquet into the crowd.

Medal count

External links
Badminton Europe: 2008 European Championships
European Championships 2008 at tournamentsoftware.com

European Badminton Championships
European Badminton Championships
Badminton tournaments in Denmark
B
Sport in Herning
International sports competitions hosted by Denmark